Apollon may refer to:

 Apollo, ancient Greek god of light, healing and poetry
 Apollon (Formula One), Formula One constructor
 Apollon Kalamarias, Greek football club
 Apollon Athens, a Greek football club from Athens
 Apollon Limassol B.C., Cypriot basketball club
 Apollon Limassol FC, Cypriot football club
 Apollon Musagète, a 1928 ballet by Igor Stravinsky
 Apollon (strongman) (1862–1928), famous 19th-century French strongman
 Apollon (ship), transatlantic luxury liner and cruise ship
 Apollon (GUI), a giFT front-end
 Apollon Patras, a sporting club
 Apollon, Norwegian popular science magazine published by University of Oslo
 Apollon, Russian literary journal (1909–1917)

 Given name
 Apollon Systsov (1929–2005), Soviet engineer and statesman 

 Surname
 Dave Apollon (1898–1972), Russian mandolin player

See also
 Apollo (disambiguation)